Queen Diambi Kabatusuila Tshiyoyo Muata is the traditional queen of the Bakwa Luntu tribe in the historic Kingdom of Luba.

Name 
Her name means "the bearer of good news".
She Holds the title of Mukalenga Mukaji wa Nkashama wa Bakwa Luntu wa Baluba wa Kasaï wa Congo that means Woman King of the Order of the Leopard of the Bakwa Luntu People who are from the Luba group of Kasaï in the Democratic Republic of Congo.

Early life 
She was born in Belgium to a Belgian mother and Congolese father who was a diplomat in Belgium at that time. She grew up in Kinshasa, capital of the Democratic Republic of Congo.

Education 
She graduated from the City University of New York.She holds her Masters in Psychology and Mental Health Counseling from Lynn University,Florida,USA. Doctorate in Public Administration from Adam Smith University of America

Activism 
She is an environmental activist. She attended Davos in 2019.

In October 2021, she visited the University of Exeter and spoke on plastic pollution. In November 2021, she addressed the Oxford Union.

References 

21st-century women
African royalty
Democratic Republic of the Congo people of Belgian descent
City University of New York alumni
Luba people
Democratic Republic of the Congo women
Living people
21st-century monarchs in Africa
Year of birth missing (living people)
People from Kinshasa